This is a list of Black Canary characters.

Supporting characters

Enemies and villains

Foes of lesser renown
In alphabetical order (with issue and date of first appearance)

Enemies created for other media
Black Canary villains "created" in other media, with no appearances in previous or subsequent comics. Those sharing the names of comic villains, but bearing no other similarities, are noted:

See also 
List of Aquaman enemies
List of Batman enemies
List of Captain Marvel enemies
List of Flash enemies
List of Green Arrow enemies
List of Green Lantern enemies
List of Superman enemies
List of Wonder Woman enemies

References 

Lists of DC Comics characters
Characters
Lists of DC Comics supervillains